West Aberdeenshire and Kincardine was a constituency of the Scottish Parliament (Holyrood). It elected one Member of the Scottish Parliament (MSP) by the first past the post method of election. Also, however, it was one of nine constituencies in the North East Scotland electoral region, which elected seven additional members, in addition to nine constituency MSPs, to produce a form of proportional representation for the region as a whole.

For the Scottish Parliament election, 2011, West Aberdeenshire and Kincardine was abolished, replaced in part by Aberdeen South and North Kincardine, Aberdeenshire East, and Aberdeenshire West.

Electoral region

The other eight constituencies of the North East Scotland region were Aberdeen Central, Aberdeen North, Aberdeen South, Angus, Banff and Buchan, Dundee East, Dundee West and Gordon.

The region covered the Aberdeenshire council area, the Aberdeen City council area, the Dundee City council area, part of the Angus council area, a small part of the Moray council area and a small part of the Perth and Kinross council area.

Constituency boundaries
The West Aberdeenshire and Kincardine constituency was created at the same time as the Scottish Parliament, in 1999, with the name and boundaries of an  existing Westminster constituency. In 2005, however, the boundaries of the Westminster (House of Commons) constituency were subject to some alteration.

Council area
The Holyrood constituency covered a southern portion of the Aberdeenshire council area. The rest of the Aberdeenshire area was covered by two other constituencies, both also in the North East Scotland electoral region: Gordon was to the north of the West Aberdeenshire and Kincardine constituency, and Banff and Buchan was further north. Gordon also covered a small eastern portion of the Moray council area.

Member of the Scottish Parliament

Election results

Scottish Parliament constituencies and regions 1999–2011
1999 establishments in Scotland
Constituencies established in 1999
2011 disestablishments in Scotland
Constituencies disestablished in 2011
Politics of Aberdeenshire
Stonehaven
Banchory
Westhill, Aberdeenshire
Ballater